Darbhanga Municipal Corporation or Darbhanga Nagar Nigam, is the civic body that governs Darbhanga, a city of Bihar in India. Municipal Corporation mechanism in India was introduced during British Rule with formation of municipal corporation in Madras (Chennai) in 1688, later followed by municipal corporations in Bombay (Mumbai) and Calcutta (Kolkata) by 1762. Darbhanga Municipal Corporation consists of democratically elected members, is headed by a Mayor, and administers the city's infrastructure, public services, and supplies.

History
Darbhanga Municipal Corporation was established on August 23, 1982. Darbhanga Municipal Corporation covers 19.18 sq. km. and is divided into 48 administrative wards.

Functions 
Darbhanga Municipal Corporation is created for the following functions:

 Planning for the town including its surroundings which are covered under its Department's Urban Planning Authority .
 Approving construction of new buildings and authorising use of land for various purposes.
 Improvement of the town's economic and Social status.
 Arrangements of water supply towards commercial,residential and industrial purposes.
 Planning for fire contingencies through Fire Service Departments.
 Creation of solid waste management,public health system and sanitary services.
 Working for the development of ecological aspect like development of Urban Forestry and making guidelines for environmental protection.
 Working for the development of weaker sections of the society like mentally and physically handicapped,old age and gender biased people.
 Making efforts for improvement of slums and poverty removal in the town.

Revenue 
The following are the Income sources for the Corporation from the Central and State Government

Revenue from taxes 
Following is the Tax related revenue for the corporation:
 Property tax
 Profession tax
 Entertainment tax
 Grants from Central and State Government like Goods and Services Tax
 Advertisement tax

Revenue from non-tax sources 
Following is the Non Tax related revenue for the corporation:
 Water usage charges
 Fees from Documentation services
 Rent received from municipal property
 Funds from municipal bonds

References

External links
 Official Website

Municipal corporations in India
Municipal corporations in Bihar